Artificial consciousness (AC), also known as machine consciousness (MC) or synthetic consciousness, is a field related to artificial intelligence and cognitive robotics. The aim of the theory of artificial consciousness is to "Define that which would have to be synthesized were consciousness to be found in an engineered artifact" .

Neuroscience hypothesizes that consciousness is generated by the interoperation of various parts of the brain, called the neural correlates of consciousness or NCC, though there are challenges to that perspective. Proponents of AC believe it is possible to construct systems (e.g., computer systems) that can emulate this NCC interoperation.

Artificial consciousness concepts are also pondered in the philosophy of artificial intelligence through questions about mind, consciousness, and mental states.

Philosophical views
As there are many hypothesized types of consciousness, there are many potential implementations of artificial consciousness.  In the philosophical literature, perhaps the most common taxonomy of consciousness is into "access" and "phenomenal" variants.  Access consciousness concerns those aspects of experience that can be apprehended, while phenomenal consciousness concerns those aspects of experience that seemingly cannot be apprehended, instead being characterized qualitatively in terms of “raw feels”, “what it is like” or qualia.

Plausibility debate 
Type-identity theorists and other skeptics hold the view that consciousness can only be realized in particular physical systems because consciousness has properties that necessarily depend on physical constitution.

In his article "Artificial Consciousness: Utopia or Real Possibility," Giorgio Buttazzo says that a common objection to artificial consciousness is that "Working in a fully automated mode, they [the computers] cannot exhibit creativity, unreprogrammation (which means can no longer be reprogrammed, from rethinking), emotions, or free will. A computer, like a washing machine, is a slave operated by its components."

For other theorists (e.g., functionalists), who define mental states in terms of causal roles, any system that can instantiate the same pattern of causal roles, regardless of physical constitution, will instantiate the same mental states, including consciousness.

Computational Foundation argument 
One of the most explicit arguments for the plausibility of AC comes from David Chalmers.  His proposal, found within his article , is roughly that the right kinds of computations are sufficient for the possession of a conscious mind. In the outline, he defends his claim thus: Computers perform computations. Computations can capture other systems' abstract causal organization.

The most controversial part of Chalmers' proposal is that mental properties are "organizationally invariant". Mental properties are of two kinds, psychological and phenomenological. Psychological properties, such as belief and perception, are those that are "characterized by their causal role".

Phenomenological properties are not prima facie definable in terms of their causal roles. Establishing that phenomenological properties are amenable to individuation by causal role, therefore, requires argument. Chalmers provides his Dancing Qualia Argument for this purpose.

Chalmers begins by assuming that agents with identical causal organizations could have different experiences. He then asks us to conceive of changing one agent into the other by the replacement of parts (neural parts replaced by silicon, say) while preserving its causal organization. Ex hypothesi, the experience of the agent under transformation would change (as the parts were replaced), but there would be no change in causal topology and therefore no means whereby the agent could "notice" the shift in experience.

Critics of AC object that Chalmers begs the question in assuming that all mental properties and external connections are sufficiently captured by abstract causal organization.

Ethics 

If it were suspected that a particular machine was conscious, its rights would be an ethical issue that would need to be assessed (e.g. what rights it would have under law). For example, a conscious computer that was owned and used as a tool or central computer of a building of larger machine is a particular ambiguity. Should laws be made for such a case? Consciousness would also require a legal definition in this particular case. Because artificial consciousness is still largely a theoretical subject, such ethics have not been discussed or developed to a great extent, though it has often been a theme in fiction (see below).

In 2021, the German philosopher Thomas Metzinger has demanded a global moratorium on synthetic phenomenology until 2050, on ethical grounds.

The rules for the 2003 Loebner Prize competition explicitly addressed the question of robot rights:
61. If, in any given year, a publicly available open source Entry entered by the University of Surrey or the Cambridge Center wins the Silver Medal or the Gold Medal, then the Medal and the Cash Award will be awarded to the body responsible for the development of that Entry. If no such body can be identified, or if there is disagreement among two or more claimants, the Medal and the Cash Award will be held in trust until such time as the Entry may legally possess, either in the United States of America or in the venue of the contest, the Cash Award and Gold Medal in its own right.

Research and implementation proposals

Aspects of consciousness 
There are various aspects of consciousness generally deemed necessary for a machine to be artificially conscious. A variety of functions in which consciousness plays a role were suggested by Bernard Baars and others. The functions of consciousness suggested by Bernard Baars are Definition and Context Setting, Adaptation and Learning, Editing, Flagging and Debugging, Recruiting and Control, Prioritizing and Access-Control, Decision-making or Executive Function, Analogy-forming Function, Metacognitive and Self-monitoring Function, and Autoprogramming and Self-maintenance Function. Igor Aleksander suggested 12 principles for artificial consciousness and these are: The Brain is a State Machine, Inner Neuron Partitioning, Conscious and Unconscious States, Perceptual Learning and Memory, Prediction, The Awareness of Self, Representation of Meaning, Learning Utterances, Learning Language, Will, Instinct, and Emotion. The aim of AC is to define whether and how these and other aspects of consciousness can be synthesized in an engineered artifact such as a digital computer. This list is not exhaustive; there are many others not covered.

Awareness 
Awareness could be one required aspect, but there are many problems with the exact definition of awareness. The results of the experiments of neuroscanning on monkeys suggest that a process, not only a state or object, activates neurons. Awareness includes creating and testing alternative models of each process based on the information received through the senses or imagined, and is also useful for making predictions. Such modeling needs a lot of flexibility. Creating such a model includes modeling of the physical world, modeling of one's own internal states and processes, and modeling of other conscious entities.

There are at least three types of awareness: agency awareness, goal awareness, and sensorimotor awareness, which may also be conscious or not. For example, in agency awareness, you may be aware that you performed a certain action yesterday, but are not now conscious of it.  In goal awareness, you may be aware that you must search for a lost object, but are not now conscious of it.  In sensorimotor awareness, you may be aware that your hand is resting on an object, but are not now conscious of it.

Because objects of awareness are often conscious, the distinction between awareness and consciousness is frequently blurred or they are used as synonyms.

Memory 
Conscious events interact with memory systems in learning, rehearsal, and retrieval.
The IDA model elucidates the role of consciousness in the updating of perceptual memory, transient episodic memory, and procedural memory. Transient episodic and declarative memories have distributed representations in IDA, there is evidence that this is also the case in the nervous system. In IDA, these two memories are implemented computationally using a modified version of Kanerva’s Sparse distributed memory architecture.

Learning 
Learning is also considered necessary for AC. By Bernard Baars, conscious experience is needed to represent and adapt to novel and significant events. By Axel Cleeremans and Luis Jiménez, learning is defined as "a set of philogenetically  advanced adaptation processes that critically depend on an evolved sensitivity to subjective experience so as to enable agents to afford flexible control over their actions in complex, unpredictable environments".

Anticipation 
The ability to predict (or anticipate) foreseeable events is considered important for AC by Igor Aleksander. The emergentist multiple drafts principle proposed by Daniel Dennett in Consciousness Explained may be useful for prediction: it involves the evaluation and selection of the most appropriate "draft" to fit the current environment.  Anticipation includes prediction of consequences of one's own proposed actions and prediction of consequences of probable actions by other entities.

Relationships between real world states are mirrored in the state structure of a conscious organism enabling the organism to predict events. An artificially conscious machine should be able to anticipate events correctly in order to be ready to respond to them when they occur or to take preemptive action to avert anticipated events. The implication here is that the machine needs flexible, real-time components that build spatial, dynamic, statistical, functional, and cause-effect models of the real world and predicted worlds, making it possible to demonstrate that it possesses artificial consciousness in the present and future and not only in the past. In order to do this, a conscious machine should make coherent predictions and contingency plans, not only in worlds with fixed rules like a chess board, but also for novel environments that may change, to be executed only when appropriate to simulate and control the real world.

Subjective experience 
Subjective experiences or qualia are widely considered to be the hard problem of consciousness. Indeed, it is held to pose a challenge to physicalism, let alone computationalism. On the other hand, there are problems in other fields of science that limit that which we can observe, such as the uncertainty principle in physics, which have not made the research in these fields of science impossible.

Role of cognitive architectures 

The term "cognitive architecture" may refer to a theory about the structure of the human mind, or any portion or function thereof, including consciousness. In another context, a cognitive architecture implements the theory on computers. An example is QuBIC: Quantum and Bio-inspired Cognitive Architecture for Machine Consciousness. One of the main goals of a cognitive architecture is to summarize the various results of cognitive psychology in a comprehensive computer model. However, the results need to be in a formalized form so they can be the basis of a computer program. Also, the role of cognitive architecture is for the A.I. to clearly structure, build, and implement its thought process.

Symbolic or hybrid proposals

Franklin's Intelligent Distribution Agent
Stan Franklin (1995, 2003) defines an autonomous agent as possessing functional consciousness when it is capable of several of the functions of consciousness as identified by Bernard Baars' Global Workspace Theory . His brainchild IDA (Intelligent Distribution Agent) is a software implementation of GWT, which makes it functionally conscious by definition. IDA's task is to negotiate new assignments for sailors in the US Navy after they end a tour of duty, by matching each individual's skills and preferences with the Navy's needs. IDA interacts with Navy databases and communicates with the sailors via natural language e-mail dialog while obeying a large set of Navy policies. The IDA computational model was developed during 1996–2001 at Stan Franklin's "Conscious" Software Research Group at the University of Memphis. It "consists of approximately a quarter-million lines of Java code, and almost completely consumes the resources of a 2001 high-end workstation." It relies heavily on codelets, which are "special purpose, relatively independent, mini-agent[s] typically implemented as a small piece of code running as a separate thread." While IDA is functionally conscious by definition, Franklin does "not attribute phenomenal consciousness to his own 'conscious' software agent, IDA, in spite of her many human-like behaviours. This in spite of watching several US Navy detailers repeatedly nodding their heads saying 'Yes, that's how I do it' while watching IDA's internal and external actions as she performs her task." IDA has been extended to LIDA (Learning Intelligent Distribution Agent).

Ron Sun's cognitive architecture CLARION
CLARION posits a two-level representation that explains the distinction between conscious and unconscious mental processes.

CLARION has been successful in accounting for a variety of psychological data. A number of well-known skill learning tasks have been simulated using CLARION that span the spectrum ranging from simple reactive skills to complex cognitive skills. The tasks include serial reaction time (SRT) tasks, artificial grammar learning (AGL) tasks, process control (PC) tasks, the categorical inference (CI) task, the alphabetical arithmetic (AA) task, and the Tower of Hanoi (TOH) task. Among them, SRT, AGL, and PC are typical implicit learning tasks, very much relevant to the issue of consciousness as they operationalized the notion of consciousness in the context of psychological experiments.

Ben Goertzel's OpenCog
Ben Goertzel is pursuing an embodied AGI through the open-source OpenCog project. Current code includes embodied virtual pets capable of learning simple English-language commands, as well as integration with real-world robotics, being done at the Hong Kong Polytechnic University.

Connectionist proposals

Haikonen's cognitive architecture
Pentti  considers classical rule-based computing inadequate for achieving AC: "the brain is definitely not a computer. Thinking is not an execution of programmed strings of commands. The brain is not a numerical calculator either. We do not think by numbers." Rather than trying to achieve mind and consciousness by identifying and implementing their underlying computational rules, Haikonen proposes "a special cognitive architecture to reproduce the processes of perception, inner imagery, inner speech, pain, pleasure, emotions and the cognitive functions behind these. This bottom-up architecture would produce higher-level functions by the power of the elementary processing units, the artificial neurons, without algorithms or programs". Haikonen believes that, when implemented with sufficient complexity, this architecture will develop consciousness, which he considers to be "a style and way of operation, characterized by distributed signal representation, perception process, cross-modality reporting and availability for retrospection." See  for a comprehensive introduction to Haikonen's cognitive architecture.

Shanahan's cognitive architecture
Murray Shanahan describes a cognitive architecture that combines Baars's idea of a global workspace with a mechanism for internal simulation ("imagination") .

Takeno's self-awareness research
Self-awareness in robots is being investigated by Junichi Takeno at Meiji University in Japan. Takeno is asserting that he has developed a robot capable of discriminating between a self-image in a mirror and any other having an identical image to it, and this claim has already been reviewed . Takeno asserts that he first contrived the computational module called a MoNAD, which has a self-aware function, and he then constructed the artificial consciousness system by formulating the relationships between emotions, feelings and reason by connecting the modules in a hierarchy (Igarashi, Takeno 2007). Takeno completed a mirror image cognition experiment using a robot equipped with the MoNAD system. Takeno proposed the Self-Body Theory stating that "humans feel that their own mirror image is closer to themselves than an actual part of themselves." The most important point in developing artificial consciousness or clarifying human consciousness is the development of a function of self-awareness, and he claims that he has demonstrated physical and mathematical evidence for this in his thesis. He also demonstrated that robots can study episodes in memory where the emotions were stimulated and use this experience to take predictive actions to prevent the recurrence of unpleasant emotions (Torigoe, Takeno 2009).

Aleksander's impossible mind
Igor Aleksander, emeritus professor of Neural Systems Engineering at Imperial College, has extensively researched artificial neural networks and claims in his book Impossible Minds: My Neurons, My Consciousness that the principles for creating a conscious machine already exist but that it would take forty years to train such a machine to understand language. Whether this is true remains to be demonstrated and the basic principle stated in Impossible Minds—that the brain is a neural state machine—is open to doubt.

Thaler's Creativity Machine Paradigm
Stephen Thaler proposed a possible connection between consciousness and creativity in his 1994 patent, called "Device for the Autonomous Generation of Useful Information" (DAGUI), or the so-called "Creativity Machine", in which computational critics govern the injection of synaptic noise and degradation into neural nets so as to induce false memories or confabulations that may qualify as potential ideas or strategies. He recruits this neural architecture and methodology to account for the subjective feel of consciousness, claiming that similar noise-driven neural assemblies within the brain invent dubious significance to overall cortical activity. Thaler's theory and the resulting patents in machine consciousness were inspired by experiments in which he internally disrupted trained neural nets so as to drive a succession of neural activation patterns that he likened to stream of consciousness.

Michael Graziano's attention schema 

In 2011, Michael Graziano and Sabine Kastler published a paper named "Human consciousness and its relationship to social neuroscience: A novel hypothesis" proposing a theory of consciousness as an attention schema.  Graziano went on to publish an expanded discussion of this theory in his book "Consciousness and the Social Brain". This Attention Schema Theory of Consciousness, as he named it, proposes that the brain tracks attention to various sensory inputs by way of an attention schema, analogous to the well-studied body schema that tracks the spatial place of a person's body.  This relates to artificial consciousness by proposing a specific mechanism of information handling, that produces what we allegedly experience and describe as consciousness, and which should be able to be duplicated by a machine using current technology. When the brain finds that person X is aware of thing Y, it is in effect modeling the state in which person X is applying an attentional enhancement to Y. In the attention schema theory, the same process can be applied to oneself. The brain tracks attention to various sensory inputs, and one's own awareness is a schematized model of one's attention. Graziano proposes specific locations in the brain for this process, and suggests that such awareness is a computed feature constructed by an expert system in the brain.

"Self-modeling" 
Hod Lipson defines "self-modeling" as a necessary component of self-awareness or consciousness in robots. "Self-modeling" consists of a robot running an internal model or simulation of itself.

Testing 
The most well-known method for testing machine intelligence is the Turing test. But when interpreted as only observational, this test contradicts the philosophy of science principles of theory dependence of observations. It also has been suggested that Alan Turing's recommendation of imitating not a human adult consciousness, but a human child consciousness, should be taken seriously.

Other tests, such as ConsScale, test the presence of features inspired by biological systems, or measure the cognitive development of artificial systems.

Qualia, or phenomenological consciousness, is an inherently first-person phenomenon. Although various systems may display various signs of behavior correlated with functional consciousness, there is no conceivable way in which third-person tests can have access to first-person phenomenological features. Because of that, and because there is no empirical definition of consciousness, a test of presence of consciousness in AC may be impossible.

In 2014, Victor Argonov suggested a non-Turing test for machine consciousness based on machine's ability to produce philosophical judgments. He argues that a deterministic machine must be regarded as conscious if it is able to produce judgments on all problematic properties of consciousness (such as qualia or binding) having no innate (preloaded) philosophical knowledge on these issues, no philosophical discussions while learning, and no informational models of other creatures in its memory (such models may implicitly or explicitly contain knowledge about these creatures’ consciousness). However, this test can be used only to detect, but not refute the existence of consciousness. A positive result proves that machine is conscious but a negative result proves nothing. For example, absence of philosophical judgments may be caused by lack of the machine’s intellect, not by absence of consciousness.

In 2022, Google engineer Blake Lemoine made a viral claim that Google's LaMDA chatbot was sentient. Lemoine supplied as evidence the chatbot's humanlike answers to many of his questions; however, the chatbot's behavior was judged by the scientific community as likely a consequence of mimicry, rather than machine consciousness. Lemoine's claim was widely derided for being ridiculous. Philosopher Nick Bostrom said that he thinks LaMDA probably isn't conscious, but asked "what grounds would a person have for being sure about it?" One would have to have access to unpublished information about LaMDA's architecture, and also would have to understand how consciousness works, and then figure out how to map the philosophy onto the machine: "(In the absence of these steps), it seems like one should be maybe a little bit uncertain... there could well be other systems now, or in the relatively near future, that would start to satisfy the criteria."

In fiction

Characters with artificial consciousness (or at least with personalities that imply they have consciousness), from works of fiction:

 AC – created by merging two AIs in the Sprawl trilogy by William Gibson
 Agents – in the simulated reality known as "The Matrix" in The Matrix franchise
 Agent Smith – began as an Agent in The Matrix, then became a renegade program of overgrowing power that could make copies of itself like a self-replicating computer virus
 A.L.I.E. – Sentient genocidal AI from the TV series The 100
 AM (Allied Mastercomputer) – the antagonist of Harlan Ellisons short novel I Have No Mouth, and I Must Scream. An omnipotent, highly intelligent supercomputer, its hatred for humanity drove it to cause mass genocide against the human race, sparing five humans to play sadistic games with them for all eternity.
 Amusement park robots  (with pixilated consciousness) that went homicidal in Westworld and Futureworld
 Annalee Call – an Auton (android manufactured by other androids) from the movie Alien Resurrection
 Arnold Rimmer – computer-generated sapient hologram aboard the Red Dwarf
 Ava – a humanoid robot in Ex Machina
 Ash – android crew member of the Nostromo starship in the movie Alien
 The Bicentennial Man – an android in Isaac Asimov's Foundation universe
 Bishop – android crew member aboard the U.S.S. Sulaco in the movie Aliens
 Bomb #19 – Thermostellar bomb for the destruction of potentially dangerous planets, aboard the Dark Star
 Bomb #20 – Malfunctioning Thermostellar bomb, aboard the Dark Star
 The uploaded mind of Dr. Will Caster, which presumably included his consciousness, from the film Transcendence
 C-3PO – protocol droid featured in all the Star Wars movies
 Chappie – CHAPPiE
 Cohen (and other Emergent AIs) – Chris Moriarty's Spin Series
 Computer – ship's computer, aboard the Dark Star
 Cortana (and other "Smart AI") – from the Halo series of games
 Cylons – genocidal robots with resurrection ships that enable the consciousness of any Cylon within an unspecified range to download into a new body aboard the ship upon death, from Battlestar Galactica
 Deviants – a group of androids that have deviated from pre-programmed instructions in Detroit: Become Human
 Erasmus – baby killer robot that incited the Butlerian Jihad in the Dune franchise
 Fal'Cie – Mechanical beings with god-like powers from the Final Fantasy XIII series
 The Geth, EDI and SAM – Mass Effect
Futurama- Bender is a good example of sapient AI, throughout many episodes, you will see Bender get angry, sad, or other emotions. Bender also has a mind of his own.
 Gideon – an interactive artificial consciousness made by Barry Allen shown in DC comics and shows like The Flash and Legends of Tomorrow
 GLaDOS (and personality cores) – from the Portal series of games
 HAL 9000 – spaceship USS Discovery One's onboard computer, that lethally malfunctioned due to mutually exclusive directives, from the 1968 novel 2001: A Space Odyssey and in the film
 Holly – ship's computer with an IQ of 6000, aboard the Red Dwarf
 Hosts in the Westworld franchise
Humagears in Kamen Rider Zero-One
 Isaac – a member of the artificial, non-biological race from Kaylon-1 that views biological lifeforms, including humans, as inferior from the TV series The Orville.
 Jane – Orson Scott Card's Speaker for the Dead, Xenocide, Children of the Mind, and "Investment Counselor"
 Johnny Five – Short Circuit
 Joshua – WarGames
 Keymaker – an "exile" sapient program in The Matrix franchise
 Lieutenant Commander Data – Star Trek: The Next Generation
 "Machine" – android from the film The Machine, whose owners try to kill her when they witness her conscious thoughts, out of fear that she will design better androids (intelligence explosion)
 Marvin the Paranoid Android - The Hitchhiker's Guide To The Galaxy, super-intelligent android who is perpetually depressed
 Mike – The Moon Is a Harsh Mistress
 Mimi – humanoid robot in Real Humans, (original title – Äkta människor) 2012
 The Minds – Iain M. Banks' Culture novels
 Omnius – sentient computer network that controlled the Universe until overthrown by the Butlerian Jihad in the Dune franchise
 Operating Systems in the movie Her
 The Oracle – sapient program in The Matrix franchise
 Professor James Moriarty – sentient holodeck character in the "Ship in a Bottle" episode from Star Trek: The Next Generation
 In Greg Egan's novel Permutation City the protagonist creates digital copies of himself to conduct experiments that are also related to implications of artificial consciousness on identity
 Puppet Master – Ghost in the Shell manga and anime
 R2-D2 – exciteable astromech droid featured in all the Star Wars movies
 Replicants – bio-robotic androids from the novel Do Androids Dream of Electric Sheep? and the movie Blade Runner which portray what might happen when artificially conscious robots are modeled very closely upon humans
 Roboduck – combat robot superhero in the NEW-GEN comic book series from Marvel Comics
 Robots in Isaac Asimov's Robot series
 Robots in The Matrix franchise, especially in The Animatrix
 The Ship – the result of a large-scale AC experiment, in Frank Herbert's Destination: Void and sequels, despite past edicts warning against "Making a Machine in the Image of a Man's Mind"
 Skynet – from the Terminator franchise
 "Synths" are a type of android in the video game Fallout 4. There is a faction in the game known as "The Railroad" which believes that, as conscious beings, synths have their own rights. The Institute, the lab that produces the synths, mostly does not believe they are truly conscious and attributes any apparent desires for freedom as a malfunction.
 TARDIS – time machine and spacecraft of Doctor Who, sometimes portrayed with a mind of its own
 Terminator cyborgs – from the Terminator franchise, with visual consciousness depicted via first-person perspective
The Doctor – from the American TV show: Star Trek: Voyager – a sentient computer program designed as a doctor that would be activated in case of an emergency or if the chief medical officer is incapacitated.
 Transformers – sentient robots from the various series in the Transformers robot superhero franchise of the same name
 Vanamonde – an artificial being that was immensely powerful but entirely child-like in Arthur C. Clarke's The City and the Stars
 WALL-E – a robot and the titular character in WALL-E
 YoRHa - A militarized faction of conscious androids from the video game, Nier: Automata. The Nier franchise repeatedly uses simulated consciousness and philosophy as a central theme.
 Robots and also the drone companion B-12 in Annapurna Interactive's game Stray

See also

 General fields and theories
 Artificial intelligence
 Artificial general intelligence (AGI) – some consider AC a subfield of AGI research
 Intelligence explosion – what may happen when a sentient AI redesigns itself in iterative cycles
 Artificial philosophy – the area of philosophy in which AI ponder their own place in the world
 
 
 
 
 
 
 
 
 
 
 
 
 Proposed concepts and implementations
 Quantum mind
 ADS-AC (system)
 Conceptual space – conceptual prototype
 Copycat (cognitive architecture)
 Global Workspace Theory
 Greedy reductionism – avoid oversimplifying anything essential
 
 Image schema – spatial patterns
 Kismet (robot)
 LIDA (cognitive architecture)
 Memory-prediction framework
 Omniscience
 Psi-Theory
 Self-awareness
 Brain waves and Turtle robot by William Grey Walter

References

Citations

Bibliography

Further reading
 
 
 Casti, John L. "The Cambridge Quintet: A Work of Scientific Speculation", Perseus Books Group, 1998
 Franklin, S, B J Baars, U Ramamurthy, and Matthew Ventura. 2005. The role of consciousness in memory. Brains, Minds and Media 1: 1–38, pdf.
 Haikonen, Pentti (2004), Conscious Machines and Machine Emotions, presented at Workshop on Models for Machine Consciousness, Antwerp, BE, June 2004.
 McCarthy, John (1971–1987), Generality in Artificial Intelligence.  Stanford University, 1971-1987.
 Penrose, Roger, The Emperor's New Mind, 1989.
 Sternberg, Eliezer J. (2007) Are You a Machine?: The Brain, the Mind, And What It Means to be Human. Amherst, NY: Prometheus Books.
 Suzuki T., Inaba K., Takeno, Junichi (2005), Conscious Robot That Distinguishes Between Self and Others and Implements Imitation Behavior, (Best Paper of IEA/AIE2005), Innovations in Applied Artificial Intelligence, 18th International Conference on Industrial and Engineering Applications of Artificial Intelligence and Expert Systems, pp. 101–110, IEA/AIE 2005, Bari, Italy, June 22–24, 2005.
 Takeno, Junichi (2006), The Self-Aware Robot -A Response to Reactions to Discovery News-, HRI Press, August 2006.
 Zagal, J.C., Lipson, H. (2009) "Self-Reflection in Evolutionary Robotics",  Proceedings of the Genetic and Evolutionary Computation Conference, pp 2179–2188, GECCO 2009.

External links
 Artefactual consciousness depiction by Professor Igor Aleksander
 FOCS 2009: Manuel Blum - Can (Theoretical Computer) Science come to grips with Consciousness?
 www.Conscious-Robots.com, Machine Consciousness and Conscious Robots Portal.

Artificial intelligence
Consciousness
Consciousness studies
Computational neuroscience